Gaetano Alberto "Guy" Lombardo (June 19, 1902 – November 5, 1977) was an Italian-Canadian-American bandleader, violinist, and hydroplane racer.

Lombardo formed the Royal Canadians in 1924 with his brothers Carmen, Lebert and Victor, and other musicians from his hometown. They billed themselves as creating "the sweetest music this side of Heaven." The Lombardos are believed to have sold between 100 and 300 million records during their lifetimes, many featuring the band's lead singer from 1940 onward, Kenny Gardner.

Early life
Lombardo was born in London, Ontario, Canada, to Italian immigrants Gaetano Alberto and Angelina Lombardo. His father, who had worked as a tailor, was an amateur singer with a baritone voice and had four of his five sons learn to play instruments so they could accompany him. Lombardo and his brothers formed their first orchestra while still in grammar school and rehearsed in the back of their father's tailor shop. Lombardo first performed in public with his brother Carmen at a church lawn party in London in 1914. His first recording session took place where cornetist Bix Beiderbecke made his recordings—in Richmond, Indiana, at the Gennett Studios—both during early 1924.

Royal Canadians
After that solitary Gennett session, they recorded two sessions for Brunswick; a rejected session in Cleveland in late 1926, and an issued session for Vocalion in early 1927. The band then signed to Columbia and recorded prolifically between 1927 and 1931. In early 1932, they signed to Brunswick and continued their success through 1934 when they signed to Decca (1934–35). They then signed to Victor in later 1935 and stayed until the middle of 1938 when again they signed to Decca. In 1938, Lombardo became a naturalized citizen of the United States. Between 1941 and 1948, their sister Rose Marie, the youngest of seven siblings, joined the Royal Canadians as the band's first and possibly only female vocalist.

Although Lombardo's "sweet" big-band music was viewed by some in the jazz and big-band community of the day as "boring, mainstream pap," trumpeter Louis Armstrong regularly named Lombardo's band his favorite orchestra.

After Guy Lombardo's death in 1977, his surviving brothers Victor and Lebert took over the Royal Canadians, though Victor left the band early in 1978 over creative differences. From 1980 the name was franchised out to various band leaders. Lebert died in 1993, passing rights to the band name to three of his six children. The band was revived in 1989 by Al Pierson and remained active .

New Year's Eve radio and TV programs

Lombardo is remembered for almost a half-century of New Year's Eve big band remotes, first on radio, then on television. His orchestra played at the Roosevelt Grill in the Roosevelt Hotel in New York City from 1929 ("radio's first nationwide New Year's Eve broadcast" which popularized Auld Lang Syne) to 1959, and from then until 1976 at the Waldorf Astoria Hotel. Live broadcasts (and later telecasts) of their performances were a large part of New Year's celebrations across North America; millions of people watched the show with friends at house parties. Because of this popularity, Lombardo was called "Mr. New Year's Eve".

The band's first New Year's Eve radio broadcast was in 1929; within a few years, they were heard live on the CBS Radio Network before midnight Eastern Time, then on the NBC Radio Network after midnight.

On December 31, 1956, the Lombardo band did their first New Year's TV special on CBS; the program (and Lombardo's 20 subsequent New Year's Eve TV shows) included a live segment from Times Square. Although CBS carried most of the Lombardo New Year's specials, from 1965 to 1970, the special was syndicated live to individual TV stations instead of broadcast on a network. By the middle 1970s, the Lombardo TV show was facing competition, especially for younger viewers, from Dick Clark's New Year's Rockin' Eve, but Lombardo remained famous among viewers, especially older ones.

Even after Lombardo's death, the band's New Year's specials continued for two more years on CBS before Dick Clark's New Year's Rockin' Eve came into prominence. The Royal Canadians' recording of the traditional song "Auld Lang Syne" still plays as the first song of the new year in Times Square followed by "Theme from New York, New York" by Frank Sinatra, "America the Beautiful" by Ray Charles, "What a Wonderful World" by Louis Armstrong, and "Over the Rainbow" by Israel Kamakawiwoʻole.

Other radio
Beginning June 14, 1953, Guy Lombardo and his orchestra had Guy Lombardo Time, the summer replacement for Jack Benny's radio program.

Other television
In 1954, Lombardo briefly hosted a half-hour syndicated series called The Guy Lombardo Show, and in 1956 Lombardo hosted a show on CBS for three months called Guy Lombardo's Diamond Jubilee.

Guy Lombardo played himself in the hit series Route 66 in the 1963 episode “But What Do You Do in March?”  In 1975, Lombardo played himself again, in the first regular episode of Ellery Queen, "The Adventure of Auld Lang Syne," which was set at a Dec. 31, 1946 New Year's Eve gathering.

Film
Lombardo and his orchestra were part of the 1934 film Many Happy Returns. and he also made a cameo appearance in the 1970 film The Phynx. Clips of his own show appeared in the 1977 film Looking for Mr. Goodbar starring Diane Keaton.

Hydroplane racing
Lombardo was also an important figure in Step Boat speedboat racing, winning the Gold Cup in 1946 in his record-breaking speedboat, Tempo VI, designed and built by John L. Hacker. He then went on to win the Ford Memorial competition in 1948 and the President's Cup and the Silver Cup in 1952. From 1946 to 1949, Lombardo was the reigning U.S. national champion. Before his retirement from the sport in the late 1950s, he had won every trophy in the field. After the destruction of the Tempo Alcoa, Lombardo retired from hydroplane racing. In 2002 he was inducted into the Canadian Motorsport Hall of Fame for his accomplishments.

Beginning in 1958, Lombardo endorsed the Guy Lombardo Royal Fleet, a line of fiberglass boats manufactured and sold by the United States Boat Corporation of Newark, New Jersey, a division of U.S. Pools Corporation. The boats were manufactured under license from Skagit Plastics of La Conner, Washington. The endeavor was short-lived and ended in 1961 with the closure of Skagit Plastics.

In his later years, Lombardo lived in Freeport, Long Island, New York, where he kept Tempo, Tempo VI, and Tempo VII (built in 1955). He invested in a nearby seafood restaurant called "Liota's East Point House" that eventually became "Guy Lombardo's East Point House". Lombardo became a promoter and musical director of Jones Beach Marine Theater. The venue was built with him in mind by Robert Moses, a fan of Lombardo. One of Lombardo's productions at Jones Beach was Paradise Island in 1961. His final production there was the 1977 staging of Finian's Rainbow with Christopher Hewett in the title role.

Life
While playing at the Music Box in Cleveland, Lombardo met Lillibeth Glenn. They married in 1926.

Death
On November 5, 1977, Lombardo died of a heart attack. Another source says he died "of a lung ailment." His wife, who died in 1982, was at his bedside when he died in Houston Methodist Hospital. He's interred at the Pinelawn Memorial Park in East Farmingdale, NY.

Tributes

Lombardo was featured on a postage stamp issued on December 17, 1999, as part of Canada Post's Millennium Collection.

Guy Lombardo has three stars on the Hollywood Walk of Fame in Los Angeles.

In 2002, he was inducted into Canada's Walk of Fame and had a star on its Walk of Fame in Toronto. Lombardo was inducted into the Long Island Music Hall of Fame in 2007.

The home where Guy Lombardo and his siblings grew up is still standing in London, Ontario, at 202 Simcoe Street. A plaque to the Lombardos has been moved from the exterior wall of the Labatt Retail Store at Richmond and Horton streets in London to the store's entranceway off the parking lot, denoting the site of a subsequent home of the Lombardos.

In his later home of Freeport, New York, there is Guy Lombardo Avenue. There is a bridge named after Lombardo in London, Ontario near Wonderland Gardens, as well as Lombardo Avenue in north London near the University of Western Ontario.

The Guy Lombardo Society is dedicated to preserving the music and history of Guy Lombardo and His Royal Canadians.

Guy Lombardo museum

From the mid-1980s until 2007, there was a museum dedicated to Guy Lombardo in London, Ontario, near the intersection of Wonderland Road and Springbank Drive. In September 2007, lacking visitors and funding, the museum was closed. Although the city owned many of the exhibits, most of the collection can be found at the private home of former part-time curator Douglas Flood. City staff recommended that the museum not be reopened. In early 2015 Flood scheduled an auction of remaining items from the collection, under protest from members of the Lombardo family.

Lebert Lombardo's children also have an extensive collection of artifacts, including photographs, record albums, sheet music, awards, and the band's framed first paycheck from 1918 in their homes and storage units in Fort Myers and Sanibel, Florida. They have tried to donate the collection to various universities and museums but have had no takers. The Library of Congress has a collection of Lombardo films.

Singles discography
Before the start of Billboard magazine's top 40 charts in 1940, Lombardo had over 140 hits from 1927 to 1940, including twenty-one No. 1 singles. The five biggest being "Charmaine", "It Looks Like Rain in Cherry Blossom Lane", "Boo-Hoo", "We Just Couldn't Say Goodbye", and "Red Sails in the Sunset".

The following singles made the "Top Ten" of the American Billboard singles charts from 1927 to 1940:

Columbia
The following appeared on the Columbia Records label:

 1927 – Charmaine
 1928 – Beloved
 1928 – Coquette
 1928 – Sweethearts on Parade
 1929 – College Medley Fox Trot (The Big Ten)
 1929 – I Get the Blues When It Rains
 1929 – Singin' in the Bathtub
 1929 – Where the Shy Little Violets Grow
 1930 – A Cottage for Sale
 1930 – Baby's Birthday Party
 1930 – Confessin' (That I Love You)
 1930 – Crying for the Carolines
 1930 – Go Home and Tell Your Mother
 1930 – Have a Little Faith in Me
 1930 – I Still Get a Thrill (Thinking of You)
 1930 – Lazy Lou'siana Moon
 1930 – Rollin' Down the River
 1930 – Singing a Song to the Stars
 1930 – Swingin' in a Hammock
 1930 – Under a Texas Moon
 1930 – You're Driving Me Crazy (What Did I Do)
 1930 – You're the Sweetest Girl This Side of Heaven
 1931 – (There Ought to Be a) Moonlight Saving Time
 1931 – Begging for Love
 1931 – By the River Sainte-Marie
 1931 – Goodnight Sweetheart
 1931 – Now That You're Gone
 1931 – Sweet and Lovely
 1931 – Whistling in the Dark
 1931 – Without That Gal!
 1931 – You Try Somebody Else (We'll Be Back Together Again)

Brunswick
The following appeared on the Brunswick Records label:

 1932 – How Deep Is the Ocean
 1932 – I'll Never Be the Same
 1932 – I'm Sure of Everything But You
 1932 – Just a Little Home for the Old Folks
 1932 – Lawd, You Made The Night Too Long
 1932 – My Extraordinary Gal
 1932 – Paradise
 1932 – Pink Elephants
 1932 – Puh–Leeze, Mr. Hemingway
 1932 – Too Many Tears
 1932 – Waltzing in a Dream
 1932 – We Just Couldn't Say Goodbye
 1933 – By a Waterfall
 1933 – Did You Ever See a Dream Walking?
 1933 – Don't Blame Me
 1933 – Going, Going, Gone!
 1933 – Lover
 1933 – Stormy Weather
 1933 – Street of Dreams
 1933 – The Last Round–Up
 1933 – This Time It's Love
 1934 – Fare Thee Well
 1934 – My Old Flame
 1934 – Night on the Water
 1934 – Stars Fell on Alabama

Decca (1934–1935)
The following appeared on the Decca Records label:

 1934 – Winter Wonderland
 1934 – Annie Doesn't Live Here Anymore
 1935 – Broadway Rhythm
 1935 – Cheek to Cheek
 1935 – I'm Sittin' High on a Hill Top
 1935 – Red Sails in the Sunset
 1935 – Seein' Is Believin'
 1935 – What's the Reason (I'm Not Pleasin' You)

Victor (1936–1938)

 1936 – Lost
 1936 – The Broken Record
 1936 – The Way You Look Tonight
 1936 – When Did You Leave Heaven
 1936 – When My Dream Boat Comes Home
 1937 – A Sail Boat in the Moonlight
 1937 – Boo–Hoo
 1937 – I Know Now
 1937 – It Looks Like Rain in Cherry Blossom Lane
 1937 – September in the Rain
 1937 – So Rare
 1937 – The Love Bug Will Bite You
 1938 – Bei Mir Bist Du Schoen
 1938 – I Must See Annie Tonight
 1938 – It's a Lonely Trail (When You're Travelin' All Alone)
 1938 – Let's Sail to Dreamland
 1938 – Little Lady Make Believe
 1938 – So Little Time
 1938 – Ti–Pi–Tin

Decca (1939–1952)

 1939 – Cinderella Stay in My Arms
 1939 – Deep Purple
 1939 – I Ups to Her and She Ups to Me
 1939 – I'm Sorry for Myself
 1939 – In an 18th Century Drawing Room
 1939 – Little Sir Echo
 1939 – Penny Serenade
 1939 – South American Way
 1939 – South of the Border
 1939 – The Umbrella Man

The following singles made the "Top Ten" of the Billboard Singles Charts, 1940–1952.

 1940 – Confucius Say
 1940 – When You Wish Upon A Star
 1941 – The Band Played On
 1942 – Johnny Doughboy Found a Rose in Ireland
 1944 – Speak Low
 1944 – It's Love-Love-Love
 1944 – Together
 1945 – Always
 1945 – A Little on the Lonely Side
 1945 – Bell Bottom Trousers
 1945 – June Is Bustin' Out All Over
 1945 – No Can Do
 1946 – Seems Like Old Times
 1946 – Symphony
 1946 – Money Is the Root of All Evil
 1946 – Shoo-Fly Pie and Apple Pan Dowdy
 1946 – The Gypsy
 1946 – Christmas Island
 1947 – Managua-Nicaragua
 1947 – Anniversary Song
 1947 – April Showers
 1947 – I Wonder, I Wonder, I Wonder
 1948 – I'm My Own Grandpaw
 1949 – Red Roses for a Blue Lady
 1950 – Enjoy Yourself (It's Later Than You Think)
 1950 – The Third Man Theme
 1950 – Dearie
 1950 – All My Love (Bolero)
 1950 – Harbor Lights
 1950 – The Tennessee Waltz
 1952 – Blue Tango

Albums discography
Decca:

 Decca DL 9014 Guy Lombardo Presents Arabian Nights (1954)
 Decca DL 8070 A Night At The Roosevelt With Guy Lombardo & His Royal Canadians (1954)
 Decca DL 8097 Lombardoland USA (1955)
 Decca DL 8119 Guy Lombardo & His Twin Pianos (1955)
 Decca DL 8135 Soft and Sweet (1955)
 Decca DL 8136 Enjoy Yourself (1955)
 Decca DL 8205 Waltztime (1956)
 Decca DL 8208 The Band Played On (1956)
 Decca DL 8249 Lombardoland Volume 1 (1956)
 Decca DL 8251 Twin Piano Magic (1956)
 Decca DL 8254 Everybody Dance to the Music (1956)
 Decca DL 8255 Oh, How We Danced... (1956)
 Decca DL 8256 Waltzland (1956)
 Decca DL 8333 Silver Jubilee (1956)
 Decca DL 8354 Jingle Bells (1956)
 Decca DXM 154 The Sweetest Music This Side of Heaven Vols. 1–4 (1957)
 Decca DL 8843 Instrumentally Yours (1959)
 Decca DL 8894 Sidewalks of New York (1959)
 Decca DL 8895 Movieland Melodies (1959)
 Decca DL 8898 Show Tunes (1959)
 Decca DL 8962 Sweetest Music This Side of Heaven, A Musical Autobiography 1926–1932 (1960)
 Decca DL 4123 The Sweetest Pianos This Side of Heaven (1960)
 Decca DL 4149 Far Away Places (1962)
 Decca DL 4117 New Year's Eve with Guy Lombardo & His Royal Canadians (1962)
 Decca DL 4180 Dance to the Songs Everybody Knows (1962)
 Decca DL 4229 The Sweetest Music This Side of Heaven 1932–1939 (1962)
 Decca DL 4268 The Best Songs Are the Old Songs (1962)
 Decca DL 4280 By Special Request (1962)
 Decca DL 4288 Dancing Piano (1962)
 Decca DL 4328 The Sweetest Music This Side of Heaven 1941–1948 (1963)
 Decca DL 4329 The Sweetest Music This Side of Heaven 1949–1954 (1963)
 Decca DL 4371 Play A Happy Song (1963)
 Decca DL 4380 Golden Minstrel Songs for Dancing (1963)
 Decca DL 4430 Golden Folk Songs for Dancing (1963)
 Decca DL 4516 Italian Songs Everybody Knows (1964)
 Decca DXB 185 The Best of Guy Lombardo & His Royal Canadians (1964)
 Decca DL 4567 Snuggled on Your Shoulder (1964)
 Decca DL 4593 Golden Medleys (1965)
 Decca DL 4735 Dance Medley Time (1966)
 Decca DL 4812 Guy Lombardo's Greatest Hits (1967)

Vocalion:
 VL 3605 Dance in the Moonlight (1958)
 VL 3833 Here's Guy Lombardo (1968)

Capitol:
 Capitol W 738 Guy Lombardo in Hi-Fi (1956)
 Capitol T 739 Your Guy Lombardo Medley Vol. 1 (1956)
 Capitol T 788 A Decade on Broadway 1946–1956 (1956)
 Capitol T 892 Lively Guy (1957)
 Capitol T 916 A Decade on Broadway 1935–1945 (1958)
 Capitol ST 1019 Berlin by Lombardo (1959)
 Capitol ST 1121 Dancing Room Only (1959)
 Capitol ST 1191 Lombardo Goes Latin (1959)
 Capitol ST 1244 Your Guy Lombardo Medley Vol. 2 (1960)
 Capitol ST 1306 The Sweetest Waltzes This Side of Heaven (1960)(reissued as SF522)
 Capitol ST 1393 Lombardo at Harrah's Club (1960)
 Capitol SKAO Sing The Songs of Christmas (1960)
 Capitol ST 1453 Bells Are Ringing (1960)
 Capitol ST 1461 The Best of Guy Lombardo (1961)
 Capitol ST 1593 Drifting and Dreaming (1961)
 Capitol ST 1598 Your Guy Lombardo Medley Vol. 3 (1961)
 Capitol ST 1648 Guy Lombardo & The Royal Canadians Go Dixie (1962)
 Capitol ST 1738 Waltzing with Guy Lombardo (1962)
 Capitol 1843 Lombardo with a Beat (1963)
 Capitol ST 1947 The Sweetest Medleys This Side of Heaven (1963)
 Capitol ST 2052 Lombardo Touch (1964)
 Capitol STDL The Lombardo Years (1964)
 Capitol T 2298 Guy Lombardo Presents Kenny Gardner (1965)
 Capitol T 2350 Guy Lombardo Plays Songs of Carmen Lombardo (1965)
 Capitol ST 2481 A Wonderful Year (1966)
 Capitol ST 2559 Guy Lombardo's Broadway (1966)
 Capitol ST 2639 The Sweetest Sounds Today (1967)
 Capitol ST 2777 Lombardo Country (1967)
 Capitol ST 2825 Medleys On Parade (1967)
 Capitol ST 2889 They're Playing Our Songs (1968)
 Capitol SKAO 2940 The Best of Guy Lombardo Vol. 2 (1968)
 Capitol ST 128 The New Songs The New Sounds
 Capitol SM 340 Recorded Live at The Tropicana

London Records:
 London XPS904 Every Night Is New Year's Eve with Guy Lombardo & His Royal Canadians at The Waldorf Astoria (1973)

Pickwick (Capitol) Budget Compilations / Reissues:
 SPC 1011 – Deck the Halls
 SPC 3073 – Sweet and Heavenly
 SPC 3140 – Taking a Chance On Love
 SPC 3193 – Enjoy Yourself
 SPC 3257 – Red Roses for a Blue Lady
 SPC 3312 – The Impossible Dream
 SPC 3358 – Alley Cat
 ACL 7057 – Guy Lombardo Plays (1977 reissue of RCA Camden CAL255, 1965)

See also

 Carmen Lombardo
 Lebert Lombardo
 Victor Lombardo
 Music of Canada

References

External links

 Official website biography
 A Tribute to London's Most Famous Musical Son
 Guy Lombardo recordings at the Discography of American Historical Recordings.
 

1902 births
1977 deaths
American people of Italian descent
Canadian emigrants to the United States
Canadian people of Italian descent
Musicians from London, Ontario
American jazz musicians
Big band bandleaders
Canadian jazz bandleaders
Canadian jazz violinists
Vaudeville performers
Canadian Music Hall of Fame inductees
Canadian motorboat racers
20th-century Canadian violinists and fiddlers
Traditional pop musicians
Canadian male violinists and fiddlers